Banja Luka or Banjaluka is the second largest city in Bosnia and Herzegovina and the largest city of Republika Srpska. Banja Luka is also the de facto capital of this entity. It is the traditional centre of the densely-forested Bosanska Krajina region of northwestern Bosnia. , the city proper has a population of 138,963, while its administrative area comprises a total of 185,042 inhabitants.

The city is home to the University of Banja Luka and University Clinical Center of the Republika Srpska, as well as numerous entity and state institutions for Republika Srpska and Bosnia and Herzegovina respectively. The city lies on the Vrbas river and is well known in the countries of the former Yugoslavia for being full of tree-lined avenues, boulevards, gardens, and parks. Banja Luka was designated European city of sport in 2018.

Name
The name Banja Luka was first mentioned in a document dated to 6 February 1494 by Ladislaus II of Hungary. The name is interpreted as the 'Ban's meadow', from the words ban (a mediaeval noble title), and luka ('valley' or 'meadow'). The identity of the ban and the meadow in question remains uncertain, and popular etymology combines the modern words banja ('bath' or 'spa'), or bajna ('marvelous') and luka ('port'). A different interpretation is suggested by the Hungarian name Lukácsbánya, in English 'Luke's Mine'. In modern usage, the name is pronounced and usually written as one word (Banjaluka).

Geography

Overview

Its tributaries—the Suturlija, the Crkvena, and the Vrbanja—flow into the Vrbas at various points in the city. A number of springs can be found nearby.

The area around Banja Luka is mostly woodland and acre fields, although there are many mountains further from the city, especially south from the city. The most notable of these mountains are Ponir (743 m), Osmača (950 m), Manjača (1,214 m), Čemernica (1,338 m), and Tisovac (1,173 m). These are all part of the Dinaric Alps mountain range.

Settlements 
The city of Banja Luka (aside from city proper) includes the following settlements:

Climate
Banja Luka has a moderate humid subtropical climate with mild winters, infrequent frosts, and warm summers.

Banja Luka has an average of 104 rainy days a year. Due to the city's relatively high latitude and inland location, it snows in Banja Luka almost every year during the winter period. Strong winds can come from the north and northeast. Sometimes, southern winds bring hot air from the Adriatic sea.

History

Roman times
The history of inhabitation of the area of Banja Luka dates back to ancient times. There is substantial evidence of Roman presence in the region during the first few centuries A.D., including the fort "Kastel" in the centre of the city. The area comprising Banja Luka was entirely in the kingdom of Illyria and then a part of the Roman province of Illyricum, which split into provinces of Pannonia and Dalmatia of which Castra became a part. Ancient Illyrian maps call the settlement in Banja Luka's present day location as Ad Ladios, a settlement located on the river Vrbas.

Middle Ages

Slavs settled in the Balkans in the 6th century. Mediaeval fortresses in the vicinity of Banja Luka include Vrbas (1224), Župa Zemljanik (1287), Kotor Varoš (1323), Zvečaj (1404), and Bočac (1446). In one document written by king
Vladislav II on 6 February 1494 Juraj Mikulasić was mentioned as castellan of Banja Luka. Below the town was a smaller settlement with one Catholic monastery.

Ottoman rule
Banja Luka fell to the Ottomans in 1527. It became the seat of the Sanjak of Bosnia some time prior to 1554, until 1580 when the Bosnia Eyalet was established. Bosnian beylerbeys were seated in Banja Luka until 1639. Ferhad Pasha Sokolović, a relative of Grand Vizier Mehmed-pasha Sokolović, had upon his return to Bosnia in 1574, begun the building of over 200 buildings ranging from artisan and sales shops to wheat warehouses, baths and mosques. Among more important commissions were the Ferhadija and Arnaudija mosques during whose construction plumbing infrastructure was laid out, that served surrounding residential areas. This stimulated the economic and urban development of Banja Luka, which soon became one of the leading commercial and political centres in Bosnia. It was also the central sanjak in the Bosnia Eyalet. In 1688, the city was burned down by the Austrian army, but it quickly recovered. Later periodic intrusions by the Austrian army stimulated military developments in Banja Luka, which made it into a strategic military centre. Orthodox churches and monasteries near Banja Luka were built in the 19th century. Also, Sephardic Jews and Trappists migrated to the city in the 19th century and contributed to the early industrialisation of the region by building mills, breweries, brick factories, textile factories and other important structures.

The Trappist monastery built in the 19th century lent its name to the neighbourhood of Trapisti and has left a large legacy in the area through its Trappist cheese and its beer production.

In 1835 and 1836, during Ottoman administration, numerous people from Banja Luka emigrated to Lešnica, Lipnica and Loznica, the villages around Loznica, and to Šabac.

Austro-Hungarian rule
Despite its leading position in the region, Banja Luka as a city was not modernised until Austro-Hungarian occupation in the late 19th century. Railroads, schools, factories, and infrastructure appeared, and were developed, which turned Banja Luka into a modern city.

Yugoslavia
After World War I, the town became the capital of the Vrbas Banovina, a province of the Kingdom of Yugoslavia.
The provincial capital owed its rapid progress to the first Ban Svetislav Milosavljević. During that time, the Banski dvor and its twin sister, the Administration building, the Serbian Orthodox Church of the Holy Trinity, a theatre and a museum were built, the Grammar School was renovated, the Teachers College enlarged, a city bridge was built and the park renovated.
125 elementary schools were functioning in Banja Luka in 1930. The revolutionary ideas of the time were incubated by the "Pelagić" association and the Students' Club. Banja Luka naturally became the organisational centre of anti-fascist work in the region.

World War II

During World War II, Banja Luka was occupied by Axis troops and was included into the Independent State of Croatia, a Nazi puppet-state led by Pavelić's Ustaše. Most of Banja Luka's Serbs and Jews were deported to concentration camps such as Jasenovac and Stara Gradiška. The Jasenovac camp was one of the largest extermination camps in Europe, which was notorious for its high mortality rate and the barbaric practices which occurred in it. On 7 February 1942, Ustaše paramilitaries, led by a Franciscan friar, Miroslav Filipović (aka Tomislav Filipović-Majstorović), killed more than 2,300 Serbs (among them 500 children) in Drakulić, Motike and Šargovac (a part of the Banja Luka municipality).

The city's Cathedral of Christ the Saviour and Orthodox church of the Holy Trinity were totally demolished by the Ustaše, as was the Church of St. George in Petrićevac. The Bishop of Banja Luka, Platon Jovanović, was arrested by the Ustaše on 5 May 1941, and was tortured and killed. His body was thrown into the Vrbanja river. The city was liberated by the Yugoslav Partisans on 22 April 1945.

1969 earthquake

On 26 and 27 October 1969, two devastating earthquakes (6.0 and 6.4 on the Richter scale) damaged many buildings in Banja Luka. Around 20 to 23 people were killed, and over a thousand injured. A large building called Titanik in the centre of the town was razed to the ground, and the area was later turned into a central public square. With contributions from all over Yugoslavia, Banja Luka was repaired and rebuilt. During this period a large Serb population moved to the city from the surrounding villages, and from more distant areas in Herzegovina.

Bosnian War

During the 1990s, the city underwent considerable changes when the Bosnian War broke out. Upon the declaration of Bosnian-Herzegovinian independence and the establishment of the Republika Srpska, Banja Luka became the de facto centre of the entity's politics.

Nearly all of Banja Luka's Croats and Bosniaks were expelled during the war and all of the city's 16 mosques, including the Ferhat Pasha Mosque, were stacked with explosives and destroyed. A court ruling resulted in the authorities of Banja Luka having to pay $42 million for the destruction of the mosques. Later, an estimated 40,000 Serbs from Croat- and Bosniak-dominated areas of Bosnia, having been exiled from their homes, settled in Banja Luka. However, the Banja Luka district court later overturned the ruling stating that the claims had exceeded a three-year statute of limitations. The Bosniak community vowed to appeal against the decision.

On 7 May 2001, several thousand Serb nationalists attacked a group of Bosniaks and members of the diplomatic corps attending a ceremony of marking the reconstruction of the historic 16th-century Ferhadija mosque. There were indications of police collaboration. More than 30 individuals were injured during the attack, and on 26 May, Murat Badić, who had been in a coma after the attack, died from head injuries. Fourteen Bosnian Serb nationalists were jailed for starting the riots.

Demographics

The 2013 census in Bosnia indicated a population of 185,042, overwhelmingly Serbs.

Population

Ethnic composition

Government

Banja Luka plays an important role on different levels of Bosnia and Herzegovina's government structures. Banja Luka is the centre of the government for the Municipality of Banja Luka. A number of entity and state institutions are seated in the city. The Republika Srpska Government and the National Assembly are based in Banja Luka.

The Bosnia and Herzegovina State Agencies based in the city include the Indirect Taxation (VAT) Authority, the Deposit Insurance Agency as well as a branch of the Central Bank of Bosnia and Herzegovina (formerly the National Bank of Republika Srpska). Austria, Croatia, France, Germany, Serbia, the United Kingdom and the United States maintain diplomatic representation through consulates-general in Banja Luka.

As of 2021, the mayor is Draško Stanivuković of the Party of Democratic Progress, elected in 2020.

Economy

In 1981 Banja Luka's GDP per capita was 97% of the Yugoslav average.

Although the city itself was not directly affected by the Bosnian war in the early 1990s, its economy was. In this period Banja Luka fell behind the world in key areas such as technology, resulting in a rather stagnant economy. However, in recent years, the financial services sector has gained in importance in the city. In 2002, the trading began on the newly established Banja Luka Stock Exchange. The number of companies listed, the trading volume and the number of investors have increased significantly. A number of big companies such as Telekom Srpske, Rafinerija ulja Modriča, Banjalučka Pivara and Vitaminka are all listed on the exchange and are traded regularly. Investors, apart from those from Slovenia, Croatia and Serbia, now include a number of investment funds from the EU, and from Norway, the United States, Japan and China.

A number of financial services regulators, such as the Republika Srpska Securities Commission and the RS Banking Agency are headquartered in Banja Luka. This, along with the fact that some of the major banks in Bosnia, the Deposit Insurance Agency and the value-added tax (VAT) authority are all based in the city, has helped Banja Luka establish itself as a major financial centre of the country.

Economic summary
The following table gives a summary of total number of registered people employed in legal entities per their core activity (as of 2018):

Culture

The Museum of Republika Srpska inherited the Ethnographic Museum established in 1930, and broadened its setting with collections of archeology, history, art history and nature. The Museum of Modern Art of Republika Srpska, also called MSURS, the Museum of Contemporary Art, displays exhibitions of both domestic and worldwide artists.

Banja Luka is home to the National Theatre and National Library, both dating from the first half of the 20th century, and of numerous other theatres. The headquarters of the Archives of Republika Srpska is situated in the building known as Carska kuća or Imperial House, built around 1880. It has been in continuous public use longer than any other structure in Banja Luka.

One of the best-known cultural sites in Banja Luka is the cultural centre of "Banski Dvor" (Halls of the Ban), built in the 1930s as the residence for the Bans of the Vrbas Banovina.

There is a number of Cultural Artistic Associations in the city. The oldest is CAA "Pelagić" (founded 1927), one of the oldest institutions of this kind in Bosnia and Herzegovina.

Sport

Banja Luka has one major football stadium and several indoor sports halls. The local handball, basketball and football teams bear the traditional name Borac (fighter). There are sixteen football clubs in the city, with the most notable being Luka are Borac Banja Luka (2020–2021 season champions of Premier League of Bosnia and Herzegovina), BSK Banja Luka, and Omladinac Banja Luka (both in the First League of the Republika Srpska), FK Naprijed Banja Luka and FK Vrbas Banja Luka

FK Borac Banja Luka is one of the most popular football club in the Republika Srpska. The club has won several major trophies in its history such as trophies as a champion of Mitropa Cup, Yugoslav Cup, Premier League of Bosnia and Herzegovina, Bosnia and Herzegovina Football Cup, First League of the Republika Srpska, Republic Srpska Cup. The club has participated in UEFA Champions League and UEFA Europa League.

The city has a long tradition of handball. RK Borac Banja Luka was the European Champion in 1976, the European Vice-Champion in 1975 and the winner of the IHF Cup in 1991.

The local tennis tournament, "Memorijal Trive Vujića", has become professional and has been awarded ATP status in 2001, with the rank of a Challenger. The Banja Luka Challenger takes place in September each year. In 2006, the Davis Cup matches of the Europe/Africa Zone Group III took place in the city.

Since 2015, the city hosts the Banjaluka Half-marathon.

In 2005 and 2019 the European Championships in Rafting were held on the Vrbas river.

Banja Luka was designated European city of sport in 2018.

Transport

Public transportation within Banja Luka is exclusively operated by the bus services. Over thirty bus lines connect the city centre with the rest of the city and its suburbs. The oldest bus link in the city is line No 1. Taxis are also readily available. The expressway E-661 (locally known as M-16) leads north to Croatia from Banja Luka by way of Gradiška, near the Bosnian/Croatian border. A wide range of bus services are available to most neighbouring and larger towns in Bosnia and Herzegovina, as well as to regional and European destinations such as Austria, Belgium, Croatia, Germany, France, Italy, Montenegro, The Netherlands, Serbia, Sweden, Switzerland and Slovakia.

Banja Luka is a minor hub of the railway services of Željeznice Republike Srpske, which comprises one half of the railway network of Bosnia and Herzegovina. Services operate to most northern Bosnian towns, and two modern air-conditioned 'Talgo' trains run to Sarajevo every day. However, services are relatively slow and infrequent compared with neighbouring countries.

The airport is served by Air Serbia, which operates flights to Belgrade and summer charters to Antalya and Athens, while Ryanair operates flights to Bergamo, Berlin, Brussels, Gothenburg, Stockholm-Arlanda Airport, Memmingen, Frankfurt–Hahn and Vienna. There is also Banja Luka Zalužani Airfield, a small airstrip.

International relations

Twin towns – Sister cities
Banja Luka is twinned with the following cities:

 Belgrade, Serbia, since 2020
 Novi Sad, Serbia, since 2006
 Sremska Mitrovica, Serbia
 Patras, Greece, since 1995
 Moscow, Russia, since 2003
 Kaiserslautern, Germany, since 2003
 Lviv, Ukraine
 Kranj, Slovenia, since 1965
 Campobasso, Italy
 Bari, Italy
 Bitonto, Italy
 Modi'in-Maccabim-Re'ut, Israel, since 2010
 Graz, Austria
 Västerås, Sweden, since 1969
 Zemun, Serbia
 Focșani, Romania, since 2012
 Kosovska Mitrovica, Serbia

People
Srđan Babić, Serbian footballer, World U-20 champion
Milorad Dodik, president of Republic of Srpska
Marijan Beneš, boxer and poet, European amateur and professional champion, Bosnian Boxer of the 20th century
Mladen Bojinović, Serbian handball player, World Championship bronze medalist
Nikola Ćaćić, Serbian tennis player
Saša Čađo, Serbian basketball player, Olympic bronze medalist and European champion
Adem Čejvan, actor
Radenko Dobraš (born 1968), Serbian basketball player
Nela Eržišnik, Croatian actress and comedian
Petar Kočić, Bosnian Serb writer
Ivan Franjo Jukić, Bosnian writer
Anton Josipović, boxer, Olympic champion
Ivan Merz, Catholic lay academic; beatified by Pope John Paul II 
Tomislav Knez, football player, Olympic champion and European Championship silver medalist
Velimir Sombolac, football player and manager, Olympic champion
Nikola Pejaković, Serbian actor and musician
Mustafa Nadarević, actor
Franjo Komarica, Roman Catholic Bishop of Banja Luka
Slađana Golić, basketball player, Olympic and World Championships silver medalist
Neven Subotić, Serbian footballer
Muhamed Filipović, Bosnian academic, philosopher and writer
Nasiha Kapidžić-Hadžić, Bosnian writer and poet
Milorad Karalić, handball player, Olympic champion
Ivan Ljubičić, Croatian tennis player, World No. 3 and Olympic bronze medalist
Saša Lošić, Bosnian singer and composer
Marija Šestić, Bosnian singer
Romana Panić, singer
Božidar Jović, handball player
Abid Kovačević, retired footballer
Aleksandar Knežević, Serbian handball player, European Championship bronze medalist
Osman Karabegović, politician
Zlatko Saračević, Croatian handball player, Olympic and World champion
Draženko Mitrović, Serbian athlete, two-time Paralympic silver medalist and European champion
Ognjen Vranješ, Bosnian footballer
DJ Krmak, Bosnian singer
Srđan Grahovac, footballer
Darko Maletić, footballer
Srđan Vujmilović, photographer
Zlatan Muslimović, Bosnian footballer
Gorica Aćimović, Bosnian-Austrian handballer
Sredoje Zekanović, director of Bokserski klub Slavija Banja Luka, director of Yugoslavia national boxing team

Gallery

Notes

References

External links

Banja Luka City homepage
Banja Luka City Travel Guide
Banja Luka News

 
Populated places in Banja Luka
Cities and towns in Republika Srpska
Municipalities of Republika Srpska
City walls in Bosnia and Herzegovina